Texas Wildcats is a 1939 American Western film starring Tim McCoy.

Plot
Lightning Bill McCoy disguises himself as an outlaw, the Phantom, to track down the murderer of his partner.

References

External links
Texas Wildcats at IMDb

1939 films
1939 Western (genre) films
American Western (genre) films
American black-and-white films
Films directed by Sam Newfield
Films with screenplays by George H. Plympton
1930s American films